Sushil Kumar Solanki (born 26 May 1983) is a former Indian wrestler. He carried the Indian flag at the opening ceremony of 2012 London Olympics. His 2008 Olympic medal was second for India in wrestling, and the first since Khashaba Dadasaheb Jadhav's bronze medal at the 1952 Summer Olympics. In July 2009, he received the Major Dhyan Chand Khel Ratna – India's highest honour for sportspersons. On 3 October 2010, Kumar handed the Queen's Baton to Prince Charles in the Queen's Baton Relay for the 2010 Commonwealth Games Opening Ceremony. Sushil won the gold medal in the 74 kg division at the 2014 Commonwealth Games.

Career 

Kumar started training in pehlwani  at the Chhatrasal Stadium's akhada at the age of 14. He was trained at the akhada by Yashvir and Ramphal, later by Arjuna awardee Satpal and then at the Indian Railways camp by Gyan Singh and Rajkumar Baisla Gurjar.

After switching to freestyle wrestling Kumar's first success came at the World Cadet Games in 1998 where he won the gold medal in his weight category, followed by a gold at the Asian Junior Wrestling Championship in 2000.
Moving out of the junior competitions, in 2003 Kumar won the bronze medal at the Asian Wrestling Championships and a gold at the Commonwealth Wrestling Championships. Kumar placed fourth at the 2003 World Championships, but this went largely unnoticed by the Indian media as he fared badly in the 2004 Olympic Games in Athens, placing 14th in the 60 kg weight class. He won gold medals at the Commonwealth wrestling championships in 2005 and 2007. He placed seventh in the 2007 World Championships and won a bronze medal at the 2008 Olympic Games in Beijing. He won a silver medal at the 2012 Summer Olympics, becoming the first person to win two Olympic medals for independent India.
Kumar was awarded the Arjuna Award in 2006 and a coveted Padma Shree by the Indian Government in 2011.

2008 Beijing Olympics
Kumar lost to Andriy Stadnik in the first round of the 66 kg freestyle wrestling event, leaving his medal hopes hinging on the repechage. He defeated Doug Schwab in the first repechage round and Albert Batyrov in the second round. In the bronze medal match on 20 August 2008, Kumar beat Leonid Spiridonov 3:1. Kumar disclosed that he had no masseur during the three bouts he won within a span of 70 minutes to take the bronze. The team manager Kartar Singh who is a former Asian Games medallist acted as the masseur for him.

2010 World Wrestling Championships, Moscow
At the 2010 World Wrestling Championships Kumar became the first Indian to win a world title in wrestling. He beat the local favourite Alan Gogaev of Russia 3–1 in the finals in the 66 kg category.

2010 Commonwealth Games, Delhi
Kumar won gold medal at the 2010 Commonwealth Games held in Delhi on 10 October 2010. He beat Heinrich Barnes 7–0 in the finals in the 66 kg freestyle wrestling category. The bout was stopped by the referee in the second round. Earlier, in the semifinals, Kumar defeated Famara Jarjou 3–0 within 9 seconds. In the quarterfinals, Kumar defeated Muhammad Salman 10–0 in 46 seconds.

2012 London Olympics

Kumar won a silver medal after losing the final to Tatsuhiro Yonemitsu.
Earlier, he had entered the final amid some controversy by beating Kazakhastan's Akzhurek Tanatarov in the semifinal. The Kazakh athlete claimed that Kumar had bitten his ear, which was denied by the latter.
Kumar was the Olympic flag bearer for India at the opening ceremony. This win made him the first Indian to win 2 individual Olympic Medals since India's Independence.

2014 Commonwealth Games, Glasgow
Kumar defeated Qamar Abbas in the 74 kg final to win the gold medal at the 2014 Commonwealth Games in Glasgow, Scotland. He won in 107 seconds by fall.

2018 Commonwealth Games, Gold Coast, Australia
Kumar won gold in 74 kg category on 12 April 2018, Thursday, beating South Africa’s Johannes Botha in the final that lasted 80 seconds thus achieving a feat of winning 3 gold medals in 3 consecutive Commonwealth Games.

International competition

Summer Olympics

World Championship

Personal life
Kumar was born in a Jat family of Solanki clan in Baprola village, near Najafgarh in South West Delhi. His father, Diwan Singh, was a driver in MTNL Delhi, while his mother, Kamla Devi, is a housewife.

Kumar was inspired to take up wrestling by his father, himself a wrestler, and his cousin Sandeep. Sandeep later stopped competing as the family could only support one wrestler. Kumar trained in pehlwani wrestling at the akhada (wrestling school) in the Chhatrasal Stadium from the age of 14. With minimal funds and poor training facilities for wrestling in India, even for the 2008 Olympic team, his family made sure he obtained the necessary dietary supplements by sending him tinned milk, ghee and fresh vegetables. He is a devoted Hindu and strict vegetarian.

He has completed his Graduation (B.P.E.) and Post-Graduation (M.P.E.) from Noida College of Physical Education, Dadri. Kumar is presently employed with the Indian Railways as an assistant commercial manager.

Commercial endorsements and media

Kumar endorses brands such as Mountain Dew, Eicher tractors, and the National Egg Coordination Committee which earns him  annually.

He appeared in the Indian documentary film Carve Your Destiny by Anubhav Srivastava. Kumar also served as a judge on MTV India's reality television series MTV Roadies. Other media appearances include in The Kapil Sharma Show and Comedy Nights with Kapil.

Awards, rewards and recognition
 Arjuna Award, 2005
 Major Dhyan Chand Khel Ratna award (joint), India's highest sporting honour.
 Padma Shri, 2011
 For the bronze medal at 2008 Beijing Olympics
  cash award and promotion to Assistant Commercial Manager from chief ticketing inspector by Railway Ministry (his employer)
  cash award from the Delhi Government.
  award by the Haryana Government.
  cash award by the Steel Ministry of India.
  cash award by R K Global
DSP Rank in Haryana police department.
 K Global.
  cash award by the Maharashtra State Government.
  cash award from MTNL.
 For the gold medal at 2010 World Wrestling Championships
  cash award from Indian Railways (his employer) & out-of-turn promotion from his current position of Asst. Commercial Manager.
  cash award from Sports Authority of India, (Government of India).
  cash award from the Delhi Government
 For the silver medal at 2012 London Olympics
  cash reward from the Delhi Government
  cash reward from the Haryana Government
  cash reward from the Indian Railway
 Land area in Sonipat for Wrestling academy by the Haryana Government.
  cash award from ONGC.

Controversies
The Delhi Police arrested Sushil Kumar in connection with the murder of former junior national wrestling champion Sagar Dhankhar during a brawl in the Chhatrasal Stadium on 4 May 2021. After arresting Kumar, Delhi Police presented him in Rohini court and the court ordered a six-day remand of Kumar to Delhi police.  In October 2021, a judge ordered Kumar continue to be held without bail. The decision was reached after arguments from both sides, and a review of evidence from the prosecution, including a video taken by an alleged accomplice of a man purported to be Kumar engaged in the attack.

See also

 India at the 2008 Summer Olympics
 Wrestling at the 2008 Summer Olympics – Men's freestyle 66 kg
 Wrestling at the 2012 Summer Olympics – Men's freestyle 66 kg
Wrestling

References

External links

 
 
 
 

1983 births
Indian male sport wrestlers
Living people
Olympic wrestlers of India
People from South West Delhi district
Sport wrestlers from Delhi
Sport wrestlers from Haryana
Wrestlers at the 2004 Summer Olympics
Wrestlers at the 2008 Summer Olympics
Wrestlers at the 2012 Summer Olympics
Wrestlers at the 2010 Commonwealth Games
Wrestlers at the 2014 Commonwealth Games
Wrestlers at the 2006 Asian Games
Medalists at the 2012 Summer Olympics
Medalists at the 2008 Summer Olympics
Asian Games medalists in wrestling
Commonwealth Games gold medallists for India
Indian Hindus
Olympic medalists in wrestling
Olympic bronze medalists for India
Olympic silver medalists for India
Recipients of the Khel Ratna Award
Recipients of the Arjuna Award
Recipients of the Padma Shri in sports
World Wrestling Championships medalists
Asian Games bronze medalists for India
Commonwealth Games medallists in wrestling
Medalists at the 2006 Asian Games
Wrestlers at the 2018 Asian Games
Asian Wrestling Championships medalists
Medallists at the 2010 Commonwealth Games
Medallists at the 2014 Commonwealth Games
Medallists at the 2018 Commonwealth Games